Birkenstock is a German shoe manufacturer.

Birkenstock may also refer to:

 Arne Birkenstock, a German film director and screenwriter
 Johann Adam Birkenstock, a German composer and violinist
 Uwe-Karl Birkenstock, a South African cricketer